Presidential elections were held in Colombia in 2010. They took place under a two-round system, with an initial vote held on 30 May and a second poll held three weeks later on 20 June. A referendum proposal that would have allowed incumbent President Álvaro Uribe the opportunity to run for a third term was rejected by the Constitutional Court of Colombia in a 7–2 ruling on 26 February 2010. Because no candidate received a majority (more than one-half) of the votes cast in the 30 May poll, the candidates with the two highest vote totals competed in a runoff election on 20 June: Juan Manuel Santos of the liberal-conservative Social Party of National Unity which unites supporters of former President Uribe, and Antanas Mockus from the Green Party. Santos won the election with 69% of the votes.

Candidates

Government group 
In 2002, Álvaro Uribe of the Colombia First party was elected president with 53.1 per cent of the vote, breaking the two-party system that ruled the country since 1958, with the promise of ending the armed conflict that haunts the country since 1964 by strengthening the Armed Forces. In 2006, he managed to change the Constitution in order to run for a second consecutive term. After a practically mute campaign, Uribe won the election with 62.2 per cent of the vote, followed by Carlos Gaviria of the Alternative Democratic Pole with a distant 22 per cent.

In 2007, Luis Guillermo Giraldo, leader of the pro-Uribe Party of the U, announced he would create the "promoters' committee", a group charged with gathering signatures to call a referendum on whether Uribe should be allowed to run for a third term in office. In September 2009, Congress approved the referendum bill in a late-night voting boycotted by members of the opposition. On 26 February 2010, the Constitutional Court voted against the referendum bill. Immediately after the ruling, former defence minister Juan Manuel Santos confirmed that he would become a presidential candidate. Another Uribist candidate was Germán Vargas Lleras of the Radical Change party. Former Colombian ambassador to the United Kingdom, Noemí Sanín, and former agriculture minister Andrés Felipe Arias, two of the closest Uribe allies, were seeking nomination by the Conservative Party. Sanín was nominated.

Opposition group 
Two of the opposition candidates were Rafael Pardo of the Liberal Party and Gustavo Petro of the Alternative Democratic Pole. Álvaro Leyva Durán, a Uribe opponent, was seeking the presidential nomination by the Conservative Party.

On 2 October 2009, the Green Party was officially created. It nominated its presidential candidate on a primary ballot that took place on 14 March 2010, the same day as the legislative election. The contenders were three former Bogotá mayors: Enrique Peñalosa, Antanas Mockus, and Luis Eduardo Garzón. The Greens seek to be a moderate force in what they called "a polarized" political situation, calling themselves "Post-Uribists." Mockus was chosen as their candidate. Former Medellín mayor Sergio Fajardo joined him as his running mate on  2010, after missing the requirements to become a presidential candidate himself.

Opinion polls

First round

Second round: Mockus vs. Santos

Conduct
On election day seven Colombian security services personnel were killed and eight were missing; parallels were drawn with FARC attacks and Santos' tenure as Defense Minister.

Results

No candidate received an outright majority in the first round vote held on 30 May. Santos and Mockus faced one another in the runoff election on 20 June, leading to the election of Juan Manuel Santos as the next Colombian President.

Santos achieved a landslide victory, with 69 per cent of the votes. Mockus got 27.51 per cent of votes. This was the largest margin of victory for a president in the democratic period of Colombia's history. Santos won 32 of the country's 33 electoral districts. His allies have an overwhelming majority in the Colombian Congress. Santos vowed to continue his predecessor's hardline stance against the country's Marxist rebels. He paraphrased Isaac Newton – "If we have come far it's because we are standing on the shoulders of giants" – and said he would rid Colombia of what he described as the "nightmare of violence".

The United States State Department said it was "pleased" with the election of Santos and praised the "spirited debate" before the runoff and Colombia's "longstanding commitment to democratic principles".

References

Presidential elections in Colombia
Colombia
Presidential
Colombia
Colombia